Jan Chramosta (born 12 October 1990) is a Czech footballer, who plays as a striker for Jablonec.

In his first season Chramosta scored five goals in nine matches and was eventually voted "Revelation of the Year" at the Golden Ball awards. He was a member of the Czech under-21 team. He represented the team at the 2011 UEFA European Under-21 Championship.

In June 2012, Chramosta scored all 5 goals in a 5–1 win over Andorra U21.

References

External links
 
 
 
 Guardian Football

1990 births
Living people
Footballers from Prague
Czech footballers
Czech Republic youth international footballers
Czech Republic under-21 international footballers
Czech First League players
FK Mladá Boleslav players
FC Viktoria Plzeň players
Association football forwards
FK Jablonec players
Bohemians 1905 players